Ballinger may refer to:

Places
 Ballinger, Buckinghamshire, UK
 Ballinger, Texas, US
 Lake Ballinger, Washington, US

Other uses
 Ballinger (surname)
 Balinger or ballinger, a type of medieval sailing vessel
 The Ballinger Company, an architecture/engineering firm
 Ballinger High School, Ballinger, Texas
 Ballinger Bearcats, a 1920s West Texas League baseball team based in Ballinger, Texas
 Ballinger Cats, a Longhorn League baseball team based in Ballinger, Texas, that played from 1947 to 1950

See also
 Pinchot–Ballinger controversy
 Ballenger